The International School of Riga (ISR) is non-profit, non-denominational, private international school located in Riga, Latvia. There are about 300 students from 47 different nationalities. 

It provides preschool, primary, middle and high school education in English for children aged 2 to 18 (Preschool – Grade 12). ISR follows the International Baccalaureate Organization's IB Primary Years Programme (PYP) from Preschool to Grade 5. The middle school (Grades 6–8) follows the International Middle Years Curriculum (Fieldwork Education). In Grades 9 and 10, students follow the IGCSE curriculum and in Grades 11 and 12, the prestigious IB Diploma Programme (IBDP). The school is authorised by the Latvian Ministry of Education and is fully accredited by the Council of International Schools.

School mission 
The school's mission statement is "We are a respectful, learning-focused community where each student is inspired to achieve his or her potential, and to become an ethical, confident and internationally-minded citizen of tomorrow."

History 
Opened in 1995

References

External links 
 

Schools in Latvia
International Baccalaureate schools in Latvia
International schools in Latvia